Roatto is a comune (municipality) in the Province of Asti in the Italian region Piedmont, located about  southeast of Turin and about  northwest of Asti.

Roatto borders the following municipalities: Cortazzone, Maretto, Montafia, San Paolo Solbrito, and Villafranca d'Asti.

Demographic evolution 

The municipality is part of the comunità collinare Valtriversa.

References

Cities and towns in Piedmont